Patriarch Euthymius of Constantinople may refer to:

 Euthymius I of Constantinople, Ecumenical Patriarch in 907–912
 Euthymius II of Constantinople, Ecumenical Patriarch in 1410–1416